Ivan Nikolaevich Lebedev was a Russian Captain 1st Rank of the Russo-Japanese War. He was known for commanding the Dmitrii Donskoi and was recognized as a war hero during the Battle of Tsushima.

Biography
On September 14, 1867, Lebedev enrolled in the Naval Cadet Corps and entered active service on April 17, 1868 with the rank of Garde de la Marine on April 17, 1871. From 1872 to May 20, 1872, he was assigned to the 15th and 8th Naval Crews. With the rank of naval Lieutenant, Lebedev was dismissed from the navy on May 20. Around this time, he attempted to enter the Saint Petersburg State Institute of Technology as he earned a living from translations and tutoring but was expelled when he tried to pass the exam for a friend. Afterwards, he would work at the Novotorzhskaya Railway and was in charge of a blacksmith in Odessa.

In 1875, he re-enlisted as a Garde de la Marine and was assigned to the 2nd Naval Crew in the Black Sea. On August 30, 1875, he was raised to aspirant and on May 24, 1878, he was the military commander of Odessa during the Russo-Turkish War. Lebedev then served aboard the Duma from June 22 to September 22, 1878 and on January 1 , 1880, he was promoted to naval lieutenant. He then graduated from the Naval Cadet Corps on November 13, 1880. He then became a naval mine officer of the Vitse-admiral Popov as well as commanded the Mackerel on February 20, 1882 and the Sultanka, he served as a junior mine officer on the Pamyat Merkuriya on September 23, 1883 and Novgorod on September 23, 1884 but was then transferred back to the Vitse-admiral Popov on September 23, 1884. On April 1, 1885, he served as the senior officer aboard the Bulgarian yacht Alexander the First but returned to Russian service on October 14, 1885.

From January 18 to April 18, 1886, he served as a miner officer aboard the Zabiyaka but was then transferred to the Russian Siberian Flotilla on March 16, 1887 and commanded destroyer no. 76 on March 30, 1887. From November 8, 1887 to April 26, 1888, he commanded the 6th Naval Crew and began participating in classes specializing in naval mines on November 23, 1887. On April 23, 1888, he became the head of the detachment of destroyers as he commanded the Bobr on October 4, 1888. He was then assigned to work with apprentice miners and divers on October 28, 1888. From February 16, 1889 to October 1, 1890, he commanded the Yanchikhe. He was temporarily transferred back to the Black Sea Fleet on September 11, 1890 with no post but then returned to the Siberian Flotilla on November 24, 1890. He also commanded the Dzhim Gamil'ton L'yuis from August 17 to October 10, 1891 to enforce poaching laws as he served from the Bering Islands to Vladivostok and also served command of the Tunguz for only two days. Lebedev then became commander of the Aleut on November 10, 1891 and the Nargen at an unknown date.

On January 1, 1893, he was promoted to Captain 2nd Rank and on June 30 of the same year, he was a member of the Provisional Naval Court. After returning to serve the Yanchikhe on July 31, 1893, he was transferred to the Korietz from September 8, 1893 to March 26, 1895. Lebedev then returned to the Zabiyaka on December 6, 1895 and on December 16, 1896, he was made the assistant adjutant commander of Vladivostok. On November 17, 1897, he commanded the Oprichnik and oversaw the construction of the Forel class destroyers in France. After being promoted to Captain 1st rank on January 1, 1901, he commanded the Oleg after its completion but then took command of the Dmitrii Donskoi in 1904 which he would take to participate in the Battle of Tsushima. He was heavily wounded during the battle, dying from them on June 3, 1905 at Sasebo.

A recollection of the events at the Dmitrii Donskoi by A. S. Novikov-Priboy documents the followign:

Awards
Order of St. Anna, 3rd Class
Order of St. Anna, 2nd Class

Foreign Awards
:

Notes

References

1850 births
1905 deaths
People from Saint Petersburg Governorate
Imperial Russian Navy officers
Burials in Russia
Russian military personnel killed in the Russo-Japanese War
Recipients of the Order of St. Anna, 3rd class
Recipients of the Order of St. Anna, 2nd class